Béatrice Hammer (born Paris, 4 February 1963) is a French writer who publishes novels and short stories for adults (since 1994) and novels for children (since 2005).

Hammer is also the author of a drama, Aristides based on the story of Aristides de Sousa Mendes, the Portuguese Government consul in Bordeaux, France in 1940.

Bibliography
Her work has not been translated into English.
 Camille, short story in Les Coupons de Magali et autres nouvelles, Sépia 1994
 La princesse japonaise (The Japanese Princess), novel, Critérion 1994 Goya Prize of the First Novel, First Novel Prize of the University of Artoy (France)
 Cannibale blues (Cannibal Blues), novel, Pétrelle 1999
 Soleil glacé (Frozen Sun), novel, le Serpent à plumes 1999 
 Lou et Lilas (Lou and Lilas), novel, Pétrelle 2000
 L'édifiante histoire de green.com (The Edifying Story of Green.com), novel, A Contrario 2004
 Le fils de l'océan (The Son of the Ocean), (for teenagers), Rageot (collection Cascade) 2005
 Le Quatuor de Mélodie (Mélodie's Quatuor), (for teenagers), Pocket jeunesse 2006
 L'homme-horloge (The Clockman), short stories, Le Mercure de France 2006
 Comment je suis devenue grande (How I Grew Up), for children, Rageot 2006
 Ce que je sais d'elle (What I Know of Her), novel, Arléa 2006

References

External links
Official website (in French)

1963 births
Living people
Writers from Paris
French women novelists
21st-century French novelists
21st-century French women writers
French children's writers
French women children's writers